Jeffrey L. Abbey (born September 1, 1998) is an American professional dirt track and stock car racing driver. He last competed part-time in the NASCAR Gander Outdoors Truck Series, driving the No. 44 Chevrolet Silverado for Niece Motorsports.

Racing career
Abbey initially began his racing career driving go-karts at age 6. He later competed in the International Motor Contest Association's Southern Sport Modifieds, winning the national championship in 2016.

Gander Outdoors Truck Series
Abbey made his NASCAR debut in 2017, driving the No. 45 Chevrolet Silverado for Niece Motorsports at Eldora. He started 16th and finished 14th. Abbey returned to the truck at the second Martinsville race, where he started 26th and finished 22nd.

Abbey returned to the series at the 2018 Eldora Dirt Derby, driving the No. 34 Chevrolet Silverado for Reaume Brothers Racing. He started 25th and finished 17th.

Personal life
He currently attends Texas A&M University, studying engineering.

Motorsports career results

NASCAR
(key) (Bold – Pole position awarded by qualifying time. Italics – Pole position earned by points standings or practice time. * – Most laps led.)

Gander Outdoors Truck Series

References

External links
 

Living people
1998 births
NASCAR drivers
Racing drivers from Texas
Texas A&M University alumni